Jamie Bone (born July 11, 1966, in Sault Ste. Marie, Ontario) is a Canadian Paralympic athlete. He competed in the 1988 Summer Paralympics. In the 1988 Paralympics, he won three gold medals and a bronze, taking a clean sweep of the 100, 200 and 400 metres.

In 2018 Bone was named one of the greatest 15 athletes in Nova Scotia's history.

References

1966 births
Athletes (track and field) at the 1988 Summer Paralympics
Living people
Paralympic gold medalists for Canada
Paralympic bronze medalists for Canada
Sportspeople from Sault Ste. Marie, Ontario
Medalists at the 1988 Summer Paralympics
Paralympic medalists in athletics (track and field)
Paralympic track and field athletes of Canada
Canadian male sprinters